Tonga Mahuta (c. 1897 – 13 March 1947) was a New Zealand tribal leader. He was the fourth surviving son of Mahuta, the third Māori King, and a younger brother of the fourth king, Te Rata. He belonged to the Ngati Mahuta iwi of the Waikato confederation.

He was probably born in Hukanui, Waikato, in 1897. His elder brothers were Te Rata, Taipu (who died in March 1926) and Tumate, and he had a younger brother Te Rauangaanga.

He also played rugby league and represented the South Auckland team (Waikato). In 1922 he was part of the team which won the Northern Union Challenge Cup from Auckland 21-20.

In 1935, he was awarded the King George V Silver Jubilee Medal.

References

1890s births
1947 deaths
Ngāti Mahuta people
Waikato Tainui people
New Zealand Māori activists